Dr Frank "Doc" McCallum (26 May 189025 September 1946) was a senior Australian public servant and medical practitioner, best known for his time as Director-General of the Department of Health.

Life and career
McCallum was born in Ararat, Victoria on 26 May 1890. He attended Wesley College for schooling, and later the University of Melbourne. In his final year of Medicine at University, during World War I, McCallum enrolled to serve in the first First Australian Imperial Force. He was sent to Gallipoli, before being recalled to Australia by Government order to complete his studies.

McCallum joined the Commonwealth Public Service in the Department of Trade and Customs, in 1920.

In May 1945, McCallum was appointed Director-General of the Department of Health. For most of his term in office, McCallum was in ill health.

McCallum died in the Royal Prince Alfred Hospital, Sydney, on 25 September 1946.

Awards
In 1922, McCallum was awarded a Rockefeller Foundation scholarship to study public health and epidemiology in the United States and the United Kingdom.

References

1890 births
1946 deaths
People educated at Wesley College (Victoria)
People from Ararat, Victoria
Secretaries of the Australian Government Health Department